Warde Joseph Manuel (born May 22, 1968) is an American college athletics administrator and former American football player. He has served as the 12th director of athletics at his alma mater, the University of Michigan, since January 2016.

He was the director of athletics at the University of Connecticut from 2012 to 2016 and at the State University of New York at Buffalo from 2005 to 2012. He served as associate athletic director at the University of Michigan from 2000 to 2005.

Early life and education
Manuel played high school football at Brother Martin High School in New Orleans. He was a first team high school All-American. He was recruited and enrolled at the University of Michigan, where he played defensive tackle for the Wolverines from 1986 to 1989, for coach Bo Schembechler, before suffering a career-ending neck injury.

Manuel received a Bachelor of General Studies with a focus in psychology, a Master of Social Work, and a Master of Business Administration from the University of Michigan in 1990, 1993, and 2005, respectively.

Administrative career
Manuel developed his management skills as assistant athletic director and then associate AD at the University of Michigan. He credits Michigan coaches and staff for his success, including Bo Schembechler, Stephen Ross, and Greg Harden, now Director of Athletic Counseling at U-M.

Manuel was responsible for the hiring of Turner Gill as the head coach of Buffalo's football team. Under Gill the team achieved its first winning season and first invitation to a post season bowl game since the program joined NCAA Division I athletics in 1999. Manuel has helped change Buffalo's image and marketing strategy. Immediately after he took office, Manuel replaced the old "Bull Head" logo with a sleeker, more modern bull. Manuel also increased the athletics budget from $11 million to $25 million within three years of his hiring.

References

Additional sources
 Manuel's can-do attitude does plenty (Buffalo News Archives)
 New Buffalo trifecta busting racial barriers (USAToday)

External links
 Michigan profile
 Connecticut profile

1960s births
Living people
American football defensive ends
Buffalo Bulls athletic directors
UConn Huskies athletic directors
Michigan Wolverines athletic directors
Michigan Wolverines football players
Michigan Wolverines men's track and field athletes
Ross School of Business alumni
Wayne State University faculty
Sportspeople from New Orleans
Players of American football from New Orleans
African-American players of American football
African-American college athletic directors in the United States
21st-century African-American people
20th-century African-American sportspeople
Track and field athletes from New Orleans